Powwow, also called Brauche or Braucherei in the Pennsylvania Dutch language, is a vernacular system of North American traditional medicine and folk magic originating in the culture of the Pennsylvania Dutch. Blending aspects of folk religion with healing charms, "powwowing" includes a wide range of healing rituals used primarily for treating ailments in humans and livestock, as well as securing physical and spiritual protection, and good luck in everyday affairs. Although the word "powwow" is Native American, these ritual traditions are of European origin and were brought to colonial Pennsylvania in the transatlantic migrations of German-speaking people from Central Europe in the seventeenth and eighteenth centuries. These folk traditions continue to the present day in both rural and urban settings, and have spread across North America.

Origins and practices 
Early colonial Pennsylvania was a melting pot of various European religious influences, as William Penn's promise of religious tolerance opened the doors for many Christian sects: the Anabaptists, Quakers, Lutherans, German Reformed, Catholics, and all manner of religious mystics and free-thinkers. It is from this blending that the Pennsylvania German powwow tradition was born.

Although the majority of the Pennsylvania Dutch were Protestant, their folk religious culture was deeply rooted in practices of the pre-Reformation era, such as the veneration of the saints, the use of folk adaptations of liturgical blessings for everyday purposes, and the use of sacred objects and inscriptions for healing and protection. These practices were brought to North America, and formed the basis of both oral and literary ritual traditions in Pennsylvania.

The majority of the early ritual traditions of the Pennsylvania Dutch were rooted in German language, but the term "Powwow" became widely used by speakers of English by the late 18th century. "Powwaw" (in one of its early spellings) was appropriated from the Algonquian language by 17th century missionaries in New England, where it originally described a healer, derived from a verb implying trance, or dreaming for divination or healing purposes. Evidence suggests that the term was applied to the Pennsylvania Dutch out of a perceived similarity in ritual healing, consistent with its borrowed meaning in English for "conjuration performed for the cure of diseases and other purposes."

Later, at the turn of the 20th century, the term "powwow" became associated with the title of the English edition of a celebrated manual of ritual procedures, entitled Pow-Wows; or, Long Lost Friend, written by John George Hohman and first published in German as Der Lange Verborgene Freund (literally "The Long Hidden Friend") in Reading, Pennsylvania, in 1820.

The verb  means "to use, to employ, to make use of, to need," while  implies a collection of traditional ways, related to "Breiche – of customs, traditions, rituals, ceremonies."

Powwow literature 
The Bible is considered the most important book of the powwow, and no practitioner would work without their Bible on hand. In addition, several popular grimoires are also utilized, primarily the Romanus-Buchlein and Egyptian Secrets of Albertus Magnus. Important to some practitioners was the work The Sixth and Seventh Books of Moses, a magical text attributed to Moses and claimed as an esoteric sequel to the Biblical Five Books of Moses, or Pentateuch. Various versions of the work can be traced to 18th- and 19th-century German sources, while an English translation was published in New York in 1880 by the German antiquarian, Johann Scheible. However, the majority of practitioners were superstitiously fearful of this work and believed it invoked all manner of evil and devilry, as explained in The Red Church by author and Braucher Christopher Bilardi.

An excerpt from The Sixth and Seventh Books of Moses, which many Powwowers find as justification for the Christian practice of powwowing, reads:

One thing must not be omitted, in conclusion, and that is, we must first become Christians before we can perform cures by Christian methods. Very few are really Christians who call themselves such; they are only Christians in name and appearance. The art of healing, according to scriptural principles, deserves special mention in this place, in more than one respect, not only because something truly magical takes place therein, but because scriptural healing is often regarded as the only true one. The principles of this art of healing have been fully established according to certain declarations and doctrines of the Bible.

People who practiced Powwowing were often women who used prayer as well as locally accepted folk remedies. Because these were individualized prayers and not rote incantations the practice was seen as acceptable among the most devout Christians and was very popular well into the 1940s.

The origins of a majority of the charms and spells utilized by the powwow are generally agreed upon to be remnants of medieval folk charms used by superstitious Catholics against illness and witchery.

It is primarily understood by practitioners of the Powwow tradition that Powwow is an Americanized version of English Cunning Craft:

Another characteristic practice of powwow magic is the Himmelsbrief or "heaven's letter". Significantly, the Long Lost Friend assures its owner that:

Whoever carries this book with him, is safe from all his enemies, visible or invisible; and whoever has this book with him cannot die without the holy corpse of Jesus Christ, nor drowned in any water, nor burn up in any fire, nor can any unjust sentence be passed upon him. So help me.

Quotations

A Sure Means to Staunch Blood 

It is helpful, though the person is far absent, if the one who uses this means for him, pronounces his name aright.

Cure for the Headache

To Remove Bruises and Pains

To Pull the Heat from Burns

In popular culture 
The tradition of hex signs painted on Pennsylvania barns in some areas is believed by some to relate to this tradition; the paintings consisted of geometric star patterns thought to have talismanic properties, though many hex signs are made simply for decoration. Some scholars disagree with this claim, however, and believe the hex signs are the natural progression of German fraktur art. (need better citation for this claim)

The 1988 film, Apprentice to Murder, stars Donald Sutherland as "powwow" doctor John Reese, and Chad Lowe as his young apprentice Billy Kelly. Reese practices the folk magic rituals in a small Pennsylvania town whose residents believe they have fallen under a curse. The film makes use of Pow Wows or the Long Lost Friend cited above.

See also 
 Dowsing
 Hex Sign
 Pentagram
 Pow wow, a gathering of Native Americans

References

External links 
 E-text of powwows, or, the Long Lost Friend
 E-text of The Sixth Book of Moses
 E-text of The Seventh Book of Moses
 A Himmelsbrief text
 Another Himmelsbrief text

Pennsylvania Dutch culture
Native American religion
Magic (supernatural)
Folk Christianity
Folk religion
Traditional medicine